Hypatopa rea is a moth in the family Blastobasidae. It is found in Costa Rica.

The length of the forewings is about 7.9 mm. The forewings are pale brownish grey intermixed with brown and a few white scales. The hindwings are translucent pale brown, gradually darkening towards the apex.

Etymology
The specific name is derived from Latin reus (meaning a party in a lawsuit, plaintiff or defendant).

References

Moths described in 2013
Hypatopa